The Jasper Newsboy is the newspaper of Jasper, Jasper County, Texas, United States.

A weekly newspaper, the Jasper Newsboy has been published continuously since July 1865, making it the oldest continuously published weekly newspaper in Texas.

The Jasper Newsboy is a part of the Beaumont Enterprise, a Hearst Corporation, also owners of the Houston Chronicle.

It is distributed in the Jasper trade area, which includes parts of Jasper, Newton, Sabine and Tyler counties.

External links
Official site

Weekly newspapers published in Texas
Hearst Communications publications
Publications established in 1865
Jasper County, Texas